Ramona Karlsson (born 8 January 1981) is a former Swedish racing driver. She has competed in the Production World Rally Championship and FIA World Rallycross Championship. She is also a member of the FIA Women in Motorsport council.

Racing record

Complete PWRC results

Complete FIA World Rallycross Championship results

Supercar

Complete FIA European Rallycross Championship results

Supercar

Complete TitansRX Europe results

See also
 List of female World Rally Championship drivers

References

External links

 

Living people
Swedish rally drivers
World Rallycross Championship drivers
Swedish female racing drivers
1981 births
European Rallycross Championship drivers
World Rally Championship drivers